is a Japanese football player for Shonan Bellmare as a goalkeeper.

Club statistics
Updated to 7 August 2022.

References

External links
Profile at Montedio Yamagata

1989 births
Living people
Tokyo International University alumni
Association football people from Saitama Prefecture
Japanese footballers
J1 League players
J2 League players
Thespakusatsu Gunma players
Montedio Yamagata players
Shonan Bellmare players
Association football goalkeepers